"Heroin Girl" is a rock song by the band Everclear from their 1995 album Sparkle and Fade. This song is generally agreed to be about lead singer Art Alexakis's girlfriend and brother overdosing on heroin; he heard the policeman say "Just another overdose" about his brother's death, a lyric used in the song.

Track listing

1-TRACK PROMO (Capitol)
 "Heroin Girl"

UK MAXI-SINGLE (Fire Records)
 "Heroin Girl"
 "Annabella's Song"
 "Nehalem (alternate mix)"
 "American Girl" (Tom Petty and the Heartbreakers cover)

UK 7-INCH (Fire Records)
 "Heroin Girl"
 "American Girl"

Charts

References

1995 singles
Everclear (band) songs
Songs about heroin
Songs written by Art Alexakis
Songs written by Greg Eklund
Songs written by Craig Montoya
1995 songs
Capitol Records singles
Teenage tragedy songs
American punk rock songs